Connor Fitzpatrick (born August 13, 1998) is a Canadian canoeist.

Career
In 2018, Fitzpatrick formed a C-2 boat with Roland Varga. They won the C-2 1000m B final in their first World Cup event in Szeged, Hungary and the following week they advanced to the A final. At the World Championships, they placed sixth in the B final of the C-2 1000m. 

In 2019, Fitzpatrick and Varga broke the National record at the 2019 World Championships in the C-2 1000m to 3:28.742 in semifinals before finishing second in the B final (11th overall). In May 2021, Fitzpatrick along with Varga were named to their first Olympic team in the C-2 1000 event.

References

1998 births
Canadian male canoeists
Living people
Sportspeople from Dartmouth, Nova Scotia
Canoeists at the 2020 Summer Olympics
Olympic canoeists of Canada
ICF Canoe Sprint World Championships medalists in Canadian